Flatningen is a lake in Vågå Municipality in Innlandet county, Norway. It is located on the far eastern edge of the Jotunheimen mountain range.

See also
List of lakes in Norway

References

Vågå
Lakes of Innlandet